João Nogueira (November 12, 1941 – June 5, 2000) was a Brazilian singer and composer, famous for his samba compositions. He was born in Rio de Janeiro.

His first composition, "Espera ó Nega" was recorded in 1968, however it was in 1970 that he gained notoriety when Elizeth Cardoso recorded his song "Corrente de Aço". His music has been recorded by some of Brazil's most well known singers such as Elis Regina, Clara Nunes, Emílio Santiago, Beth Carvalho and Alcione. He is also the father of singer and composer Diogo Nogueira.

Discography

1972 João Nogueira
1974 E Lá Vou Eu
1975 Vem Quem Tem
1977 Espelho
1978 Vida Bohêmia
1979 Clube Do Samba
1980 Boca Do Povo
1981 Homem aos 40
1981 Wilson, Geraldo & Noel
1983 Bem Transado
1984 Pelas Terras Do Pau-Brasil
1985 De Amor É Bom
1986 Boteco Do Arlindo
1988 João
1992 Programa Ensaio
1994 Parceria
1996 Letra & Música
1998 De Todos Os Sambas
2000 Através Do Espelho

1941 births
2000 deaths
Brazilian composers
Musicians from Rio de Janeiro (city)
20th-century Brazilian male singers
20th-century Brazilian singers
20th-century composers